Sheila Bond (born Sheila Phyllis Berman; March 16, 1927 - March 25, 2017) was an American actress and singer, known for her work on Broadway.

Personal life
Bond was born Sheila Phyllis Berman in New York City of Jewish descent, and was educated at the Professional Children's School in New York City. She retired from show business. She was divorced from Barton L. Goldberg, with whom she had two children, Brad Goldberg and Lori Yarom. She had five grandchildren. She had a sister, Francine, currently married to singer Don Cherry. She divided her time between New York City and Boca Raton, Florida.

Bond married broker Leo Coff on March 20, 1948,

Career
Bond became a professional dancer in the early 1940s. She debuted on Broadway in 1943 as a dancer in Artists and Models. She appeared in the revue, Make Mine Manhattan in 1948.  Her film career began with playing the sister of Judy Holliday, whom Bond resembled, in The Marrying Kind in 1952. She is best known for her 1953 Tony Award-winning performance as Fay Fromkin in the original Broadway production of Wish You Were Here.

Bond's work on television included being the main dancer on Inside U.S.A. With Chevrolet, which led to her being featured in photographs about the program in an article in Life magazine. She also appeared on ABC Album, Appointment with Adventure, The Arthur Murray Party, The Colgate Comedy Hour, The Ed Sullivan Show, Four Star Revue, Frankie Laine Time, Playhouse 90, The Saturday Night Revue with Jack Carter, and The Texaco Star Theatre Starring Milton Berle.

Death
On March 25, 2017, Bond died at her Manhattan home at the age of 90.

References

External links
 
 

1927 births
2017 deaths
Jewish American actresses
Actresses from New York City
Singers from New York City
American film actresses
American stage actresses
American musical theatre actresses
American television actresses
Tony Award winners
21st-century American Jews
21st-century American women